Flurry may refer to:

 A snow flurry, a brief snow shower
 Flurry, a Super Mario series enemy character
 The Flurry Festival, an annual folk music and dance festival in Saratoga Springs, New York
 Flurry Heart, one of the supporting characters in My Little Pony: Friendship is Magic 
 Flurry (company), a mobile analytics and monetization platform
 McFlurry, a McDonald's ice cream dessert